Albatros Flugzeugwerke GmbH was a German aircraft manufacturer best known for supplying the German airforces during World War I.

The company was based in Johannisthal, Berlin, where it was founded by Walter Huth and Otto Wiener on December 20, 1909. The company (and its subsidiary, Ostdeutsche Albatros Werke (OAW)) produced many capable fighter aircraft, notably the Albatros D.III and Albatros D.V, both designed by Robert Thelen. The Albatros merged into Focke-Wulf in 1931.

History 
The company was founded in Berlin-Johannisthal in late 1909 by Enno Walther Huth as the Albatros Werke AG.
The first aircraft the company produced was a French Antoinette monoplane, which they built under licence.

They then produced several versions of the Etrich Taube monoplane, as well the Doppeltaube biplane which used the same basic planform. A variety of other biplanes, with more conventional wing planforms were also built and flown.

In 1912 five Albatros F-2 were built. This was a development of the French Farman III biplane (hence the letter F) with a gondola for the crew and an Argus in-line engine instead of the original Gnome Omega rotary engine. Four were sold to Bulgaria where they took an active part in the  1912-1913 Balkan wars.

On October 16, 1912 one of these carried out the first combat mission over Europe.

During World War I Albatros Flugzeugwerke produced about 10,300 aircraft, including fighters, bombers and reconnaissance aircraft. After the war, production of various civilian types was carried out.

Aircraft

References

External links

 The Virtual Aviation Museum

Defunct aircraft manufacturers of Germany
 
Manufacturing companies based in Berlin
Manufacturing companies established in 1909
Manufacturing companies disestablished in 1931
1909 establishments in Germany
1931 disestablishments in Germany
Companies of Prussia